The architecture of Taiwan can be traced back to stilt housing of the aborigines in prehistoric times; to the building of fortresses and churches in the north and south used to colonize and convert the inhabitants during the Dutch and Spanish period; the Tungning period when Taiwan was a base of anti-Qing sentiment and Minnan-style architecture was introduced; in Qing dynasty period, a mix of Chinese and Western architecture appeared and artillery battery flourished during Qing's Self-Strengthening Movement; During the Japanese rule of Taiwan, the Minnan, Japanese and Western culture were main influencers in architectural designs and saw the introduction and use of reinforced concrete. Due to excessive Westernization as a colony, after the retrocession of Taiwan to the Republic of China in 1945 from Japan at the end of World War II, Chinese classical style became popular and entered into international mainstream as a postmodern design style. Today, Taiwanese architecture has undergone much diversification, every style of architecture can be seen.

Prehistory (−1621) 

The architecture of prehistoric Taiwan saw structures ranging from cave dwellings, stilt housing, to stone masonry. Primarily of Austronesian architecture.

Cave dwelling
Prehistoric man made use of caves for their dwellings, and Taiwan's oldest known civilization is the Changbin culture (長濱文化) dating back to over 50,000 years. An example of an archaeological site of a cave dwelling is the Bashian Caves in Changbin Township, Taitung County which is dated from between 5,500 and 30,000 years. The actual cave itself has a height of around ten meters and can accommodate some ten persons.

Stilt housing

Spread over the vast prehistoric Pacific Ocean and Indian Ocean areas, stilt houses vary greatly. In more recent times, Taiwanese aborigines make use of them for holding church meetings, as places to cool down and to hold ancestral activities. Apart from their cooling effect, stilt houses also have various functions such as avoiding miasma, dampness, flood, and insects and snakes from entering, it is also easier to construct.

Stone-slab housing
The Paiwan and Bunun peoples made houses using thatched roofing and made walls from stones. Homes of nobles were decorated with elaborate wood carvings. The special characteristics of such houses is that dark colored building materials help conceal the buildings in its environment and the layered use of rocks mimic the scales of the hundred pacer snake that they worship.

Aboriginal architecture

Chinese and aborigines made use of natural materials such as straw, wood, bamboo, grass, stone, and soil as basic construction materials. The types and styles of building vary depending on the environment, climate, and cultural influences of each ethnic group. For example, the Amis tend to live in larger communities and planned the layout of their community such as placement of communal homes and a plaza for matters of governance inside, planting a bamboo forest around the outside with camps and guard stations to defend against foreign aggressors. The Atayal and Saisiyat peoples made their homes out of wood and bamboo, while the Tao people who lived further away on Orchid Island and faced strong changes in seasonal weather such as typhoons, developed houses that made use of digging vertically into the ground to strengthen their foundations.

Dutch and Spanish settlement (1624–1662)
The 16th century was a time of Western naval navigation, exploration and trade and also the shifting of power from the Ming dynasty to the Qing dynasty. Most of the architecture in Taiwan from this period were dominated by fortresses, primarily the Dutch Fengguiwei Fort, Fort Zeelandia, Fort Provintia in the south and the Spanish Fort San Salvador (聖薩爾瓦多城), Fort San Domingo to the north. The Dutch used red bricks in construction while the Spanish used stone. Both sides made use of ports and constructed fortresses to consolidate their power on the island. The fortresses were square shaped with an additional side for the installment of artillery. This period saw Taiwan architecture enter the peak of Western colonization. Such structures from this period represent the first generation of architectural works and is now listed as a world heritage by the Republic of China government.

Kingdom of Tungning (1662–1682)

Qing dynasty (1683–1896) 
Minnan-style architecture

Hakka Architecture

Fuzhou-style ArchitectureTeochew-style architecture

Lingnan-style architecture

Western-style architecture
Fort

Period of Japanese rule (1896–1945) 
Western-style Architecture
Exotic Revival Style

Early Modern Architecture
Traditional Taiwanese and Taiwanese-Western Eclectic Architecture

Japanese-style and Japanese-Western Eclectic Architecture

Asian Renaissance Style(興亞式) and Imperial Crown Style

Republic of China (1946–present)
Chinese Cultural Renaissance

Newly built traditional Taiwanese architecture

Modern Architecture

See also

List of tallest buildings in Taiwan
List of temples in Taiwan
List of cities with most skyscrapers

References